Ala Littoria S.A. was the Italian national airline that operated during the fascist regime in the 1930s and 1940s.

History 

Ala Littoria was formed by a merger of Società Aerea Mediterranea (SAM), Società Anonima Navigazione Aerea (SANA), Società Italiana Servizi Aerei (SISA) and Aero Espresso Italiana (AEI) in 1934.

The airline was owned by the Italian government and predominantly featured the Italian flag on its aircraft. It also showed the fascism symbol in some routes.

The airline used mainly state-of-the-art aircraft from Savoia-Marchetti, but other Italian aircraft (like "Breda" and "Caproni") were used in the late 1930s.

The first commercial flight in Italy was started in 1923, but it reached full international service only with "Ala Littoria" that was promoted by Mussolini with a name related to the "Fasci Littori" of his Fascism.
 

In 1934 Ala Littoria was enlarged and started some flights toward European countries, like France, and also toward the eastern Mediterranean region

After the Spanish Civil War, Ala Littoria invested in Iberia, the Spanish airline that was established following the demise of LAPE. Ala Littoria acquired 12,5 % of the airline and purchased three Junkers Ju 52 airframes without engines from Lufthansa, giving them to Iberia in lieu of capital.

Ala Littoria flew to destinations across Europe and the Italian colonies in Africa. In 1934 was done an experimental flight from Rome to Mogadiscio in Italian Somalia, that established a world record on long distance civil flight and allowed to start the prestigious Imperial Line (Linea dell'Impero) the next year, in 1935.

Linea dell'Impero was the longest route in Africa by Ala Littoria in the years preceding World War II and was considered the most prestigious Italian air route of the time. It connected Rome with Mogadiscio in Italian East Africa, and from 1939 the route could be travelled without a change of airplane with a state-of-the-art- Savoia Marchetti (civilian) SM 75.

In March 1938 the airline did the first record flight from Rome to Argentina with the route Roma-Cagliari-Bathurst/Gambia-Bahia-Rio de Janeiro-Buenos Aires, using a special hydroplane of the model Cant Z 506, but later the company was substituted by the newly created LATI for the Latin American flights.

Ala Littoria routes in 1940 grew to 37,110 km, mainly in the Mediterranean and Africa. This gave Italy the fifth most extensive air routes in the world (after the US, the USSR, Germany and the UK).

During the Second World War, Ala Littoria acted as a transport service for the Italian military. However the airline did not survive the war and was disbanded. It was substituted after the war by Alitalia – Linee Aeree Italiane, that was established on 16 September 1946 as "Aerolinee Italiane Internazionali" and later was called Alitalia.

Airports connected

In 1940 Ala Littoria reached and connected the following airports:

Italy
 Alghero, Ancona, Bologna, Brindisi, Cagliari, Catania, Fiume (at that time Italian territory), Genoa, Lussino (at that time Italian territory), Milan, Naples, Palermo, Pola (at that time Italian territory), Rimini, Rhodes, Rome, Syracuse, Trapani, Trieste, Venice, Zara (at that time Italian territory).

Northern and Eastern Italian Africa 
 Addis Ababa, Asmara, Massaua, Assab, Dessiè, Dire Dawa, Gambela-Dembidollo, Gimma, Gondar, Gorrahei, Lechemtì-Asosa, Mogadishu, Negelle, Benghazi, Tripoli.

Europe
 Athens, Barcelona, Belgrade, Berlin, Bucharest, Cadiz, Constanța, Lisbon, Malaga, Malta, Marseille, Munich, Palma, Paris, Thessaloniki, Seville, Tirana, Vienna.

Middle East and Africa
 Baghdad, Basra, Cairo, Djibouti, Haifa, Khartoum, Melilla, Tetouan, Tunis, Wadi Halfa.

Airplanes
In 1940, Ala Littoria's fleet included 39 Seaplanes and 74 landplanes:

Seaplanes
 14 CANT Z.506
 8 Macchi M.C.94
 16 Savoia-Marchetti S.66
 1 Dornier Do J

Airplanes
 4 Breda Ba.44
 10 Caproni Ca.133
 3 Savoia-Marchetti S.71
 18 Savoia-Marchetti S.73
 3 Savoia-Marchetti S.74
 36 Savoia-Marchetti S.75

Accidents and incidents

Fatal accidents
 On 24 September 1936, CANT Z.506 I-RODI struck a ship mast following an engine fire and crashed off Benghazi, Libya, killing nine of 10 on board.
 On 2 August 1937, Savoia-Marchetti S.73 I-SUSA crashed on approach to Wadi Halfa Airport, Sudan, with the loss of all 9 occupants (6 pax and 3 crew). The crew, for reasons unknown, carried out a missed approach, but the aircraft then stalled and crashed.
 On 13 February 1938, CANT Z.506 I-ORIA crashed off Sardinia, Italy in poor weather, killing all 14 on board.
 On 30 April 1938, Fight 422, operated by Savoia-Marchetti S.73 I-MEDA, crashed on a flight from Tirana to Rome. The aircraft struck the mountains near Maranola and all nineteen occupants were killed.
 On 14 July 1938, Savoia-Marchetti S.66 I-VOLO crashed in the Mediterranean Sea 91 mi off Terranova, Sardinia, Italy, killing all 20 on board.
 On 22 November 1938, Savoia-Marchetti SM.75C I-TUON crashed near Winklern, Austria in poor weather after the aircraft was blown off course, killing four of five on board.
 On 17 October 1939, a Savoia-Marchetti S.73, possibly I-IESI, reportedly struck a hill and crashed near Olias, Spain, killing 15 of 17 on board. The aircraft type was not reported in newspaper reports, but was most likely an S.73.
 On 4 December 1939, Junkers Ju 52/3mlu flying in bad weather between Munich and Berlin struck a hillside near Bayerisch Eisenstein, Germany, at an altitude of about 1000 meters (3281 feet) and crashed, killing four of the 17 people on board.
 On 10 February 1940, Savoia-Marchetti SM.75 I-LEAL struck a wooded mountainside at Aiello Calabro, Italy, killing all ten on board.
 On 16 May 1940, Savoia-Marchetti SM.75 I-LUPI crashed on takeoff at Barcelona Airport, killing all eight on board. A ladder stored in the cargo hold shifted and jammed the controls.
 On 30 July 1941, Macchi M.C.100 I-PACE crashed at Lido di Ostia Seaplane Base while the crew was attempting to return following an engine problem, killing five of 25 on board.
 On 23 November 1942, Savoia-Marchetti SM.75 I-MAGA crashed in the Mediterranean Sea, killing all four on board; the aircraft was probably shot down.

Non-fatal accidents
 On 13 October 1939, Caproni Ca.133 I-DIRE crashed at Gabode, Djibouti following engine failure; all six on board survived.
 On 17 January 1941, Savoia-Marchetti SM.75 I-LUME crashed while landing at Fontanarossa Airport. Thirty minutes after takeoff the aircraft returned to the airport  when the right engine caught fire. While landing the aircraft struck two Luftwaffe Junkers Ju 88s, causing serious damage. All 17 on board were able to escape before the aircraft burned out. The aircraft was operating a military flight.

See also
 List of defunct airlines of Italy
 Imperial Line

References

External links

 Aeroporto Portela Lisbon 1943?, Ala Littoria Savoia Marchetti, Lufthansa DC-3
 Aeroporto Portela Lisbon 1943?, I-BUTI

Italian companies established in 1934
1945 disestablishments in Italy
Defunct airlines of Italy
Airlines established in 1934
Airlines disestablished in 1945
Defunct seaplane operators